Sir Nigel Hamilton Nicholls  (19 February 1938 – 21 December 2016) was a British civil servant.

In 1982 he was made Commander of the Order of the British Empire having worked as Assistant Secretary at the Ministry of Defence during the Falklands War. Nicholls served as Clerk of the Privy Council between 1992 and 1998. On 21 October 1998 he was knighted as Knight Commander of the Royal Victorian Order. He died on 21 December 2016.

References

1938 births
2016 deaths
British civil servants
Clerks of the Privy Council
Commanders of the Order of the British Empire
Knights Commander of the Royal Victorian Order